Cornelius Edward "Neil" Gallagher (March 2, 1921 — October 17, 2018) was an American Democratic Party politician who represented New Jersey's 13th congressional district in the United States House of Representatives from 1959 until 1973.

Early years
Gallagher was born in Bayonne, New Jersey. His father, a police officer, died when he was eight. He began working at a young age as a newsboy, and later a soda jerk. He attended St. Mary's School and Bayonne High School and graduated from John Marshall College in 1946; in 1945 and 1946 he was a member of the faculty of Rutgers University.  He also graduated from John Marshall Law School with an LL.B. in 1948 (both now part of Seton Hall University, and engaged in additional studies at New York University in 1948 and 1949. Gallagher was admitted to the bar in 1949.

Army 
During World War II, Gallagher commanded an infantry rifle company in General George S. Patton's Third Army in Europe.  He served from September 1941 and was discharged as a captain in November 1946. During the Korean War, he served one year.

Career 
Gallagher was appointed a director of the Broadway National Bank.  He was elected to the Hudson County Board of Chosen Freeholders in 1953, a post he held until resigning in 1956, when he was appointed commissioner of the New Jersey Turnpike Authority.  Gallagher was also a delegate to the Democratic National Conventions of 1952, 1956 and 1960.

He was elected as a Democrat to the Eighty-sixth through Ninety-second Congresses (January 3, 1959 – January 3, 1973).  In Congress, he served on the House Foreign Affairs Committee and the Committee on Government Operations.

Gallagher subsequently became vice president of Baron/Canning International in New York City, and was a resident of the Columbia section of Knowlton Township, New Jersey.

Conflict with J. Edgar Hoover
As a congressman, Gallagher chaired the Invasion of Privacy Subcommittee. Gallagher was a critic of the tactics of Federal Bureau of Investigation Director J. Edgar Hoover and Attorney General Robert F. Kennedy. Gallagher was approached by attorney Roy Cohn, who asked him on behalf of Hoover to hold hearings which would shift the blame for government surveillance from Hoover to Kennedy. Gallagher refused. 

Media accounts then surfaced, including Life magazine, which contained alleged leaked material from FBI wiretaps suggesting that Gallagher was connected to the mafia, Gallagher accused Hoover of fabricating the stories to hound him from public life. Cohn met with Gallagher again, demanding on Hoover's behalf that he resign or face further allegations. 

Gallagher was accused of evading payment of $74,000 in federal income taxes in 1966.  He pled guilty in 1972 to tax evasion and perjury, sentenced to two years in prison and fined $10,000.

A book detailing Gallagher's side of the story was published in 2003.

Death 
Gallagher died on October 17, 2018 at the age of 97.

See also
List of American federal politicians convicted of crimes
List of federal political scandals in the United States

References

External links
 
Cornelius E. Gallagher Collection and Photograph Collection at the Carl Albert Center

Privacy activists
1921 births
2018 deaths
20th-century American lawyers
American people convicted of tax crimes
County commissioners in New Jersey
Deaths from brain cancer in the United States
Democratic Party members of the United States House of Representatives from New Jersey
Military personnel from New Jersey
New Jersey lawyers
New Jersey politicians convicted of crimes
New York University School of Law alumni
People from Knowlton Township, New Jersey
Politicians from Bayonne, New Jersey
Rutgers University faculty
Seton Hall University School of Law alumni
United States Army officers
United States Army personnel of the Korean War
United States Army personnel of World War II